Triptychus incantatus is a species of sea snail, a marine gastropod mollusk in the family Pyramidellidae, the pyrams and their allies.

References

External links
 To World Register of Marine Species
 Bartsch, P. (1926). Additional new mollusks from Santa Elena Bay, Ecuador. Proceedings of the United States National Museum. 69(2646): 1-20, pls. 1-3.
 LaFollette P. (1977). An old name for Triptychus pacificus Corgan, 1973. The Veliger. 19(3): 368-369

Pyramidellidae
Gastropods described in 1926